Cobián is a surname. Notable people with the surname include:
 Alfonso Valdés Cobián (1890–1988), industrialist, banker, sportsman and politician
 José Cobián (born 1998), Mexican professional footballer
 Juan Carlos Cobián (1888–1942), Argentine bandleader and tango composer
 Juan Cobián (born 1975), Argentine former footballer
 Miguelina Cobián (1941–2019), Cuban sprinter
 Ramón Valdés Cobián (fl. 1910s–1930s), Puerto Rican politician

See also 
 Cobia (disambiguation)
 Cobian Backup, backup software for Microsoft Windows
 Cobiana language, a language of Senegal and Guinea-Bissau
 Senator Cobián (disambiguation)